There have been four baronetcies created for persons with the surname Cope.

The Baronetcy of Cope of Hanwell, Oxfordshire was created in the Baronetage of England on 29 June 1611 for Anthony Cope of Hanwell Castle. He was a descendant of William Cope, (Cofferer to Henry VII) to whom the manor of Hanwell was granted in 1498. He was Member of Parliament for Banbury and for Oxfordshire. The second, third and fifth Baronets also represented both Banbury and Oxfordshire. In 1699 The sixth Baronet purchased Bramshill House, Hampshire which became the family seat. He was member for Plymouth and Tavistock. The seventh Baronet represented Banbury and Newport, IOW. The Baronetcy was extinct on the death of the sixteenth Baronet.

The Baronetcy of Cope of Bruern, Oxfordshire, was created in the Baronetage of Great Britain on 1 March 1714 for Jonathan Cope of Bruern Abbey, grandson of Jonathan Cope of Ranton Abbey, who was a younger son of Sir William Cope, 2nd Baronet of Hanwell. He was Member of Parliament for Banbury from 1713 to 1722. The Baronetcy was extinct on the death of the fourth Baronet in 1821.

The Baronetcy of Cope of Osbaston, Leicestershire was created for Thomas Cope of Osbaston Hall, in the Baronetage of the United Kingdom in 1918. It was extinct on the death of his son in 1966.

The Baronetcy of Cope of St Mellons, Monmouthshire was created for William Cope in the Baronetage of the United Kingdom in 1928. He was later, in 1945, created Baron Cope.

Cope of Hanwell (1611)
 Sir Anthony Cope, 1st Baronet (1550–1615)
 Sir William Cope, 2nd Baronet (1577–1637)
 Sir John Cope, 3rd Baronet (1608–1638)
 Sir Anthony Cope, 4th Baronet (1632–1675)
 Sir John Cope, 5th Baronet (1634–1721)
 Sir John Cope, 6th Baronet (1673–1749)
 Sir Monoux Cope, 7th Baronet (1696–1763)
 Sir John Mordaunt Cope, 8th Baronet (1731–1779)
 Sir Richard Cope, 9th Baronet (died 1806)
 Sir Denzil Cope, 10th Baronet (1766–1812)
 Sir John Cope, 11th Baronet (1768–1851)
 Sir William Henry Cope, 12th Baronet (1811–1892)
 Sir Anthony Cope, 13th Baronet (1842–1932)
 Sir Denzil Cope, 14th Baronet (1873–1940)
 Sir Anthony Mohun Leckonby Cope, 15th Baronet (1927–1966)
 Sir Mordaunt Leckonby Cope, MC, 16th Baronet (1878–1972)

Cope of Bruern (1714)
 Sir Jonathan Cope, 1st Baronet ( – 1765)
 Sir Charles Cope, 2nd Baronet (c. 1743 – 1781)
 Sir Charles Cope, 3rd Baronet (c. 1770 – 1781)
 Sir Jonathan Cope, 4th Baronet (c. 1758 – 1821)

Cope of Osbaston (1918)
 Sir Thomas Cope, 1st Baronet (1840–1924)
 Sir Thomas George Cope, 2nd Baronet (1884–1966)

Cope of St Mellons (1928)
For details see Baron Cope

References

 

Extinct baronetcies in the Baronetage of England
Extinct baronetcies in the Baronetage of Great Britain
Extinct baronetcies in the Baronetage of the United Kingdom
1611 establishments in England